NKX-homeodomain factors are a family of homeodomain transcription factors that are critical regulators of organ development.

Human genes that encode NKX-homeodomain factors include:

 NKX1-1, NKX1-2
 NKX2-1, NKX2-2, NKX2-4, NKX2-8
 NKX3-1, NKX3-2
 NKX6-1, NKX6-2, NKX6-3

References 

Developmental genes and proteins
Transcription factors